Only Forever is the debut and only studio album by American rock band Alive Like Me. It was released in October 2014.

Based in the college town of Eugene, Oregon, singer Jairus Kersey, guitarists Brandon Banton and Dakota Dufloth, bassist David Knox, and drummer Joel Riley quickly built momentum releasing their first single "Start Again". As their reputation grew, they came to the attention of prominent Oregon indie Rise Records, who signed the band in early 2014. After joining the Vans Warped Tour for several dates that summer, they released their debut album, Only Forever, in October 2014.

Track listing

Personnel
Credits for Only Forever adapted from AllMusic.

Alive Like Me
 Brandon Banton – guitars
 Dakota Dufloth – guitars
 Jairus Kersey – lead vocals
 David Knox – bass guitar
 Joel Riley – drums, percussion

Production
 Kris Crummett – mastering
 Ryan Furlott – producer
 Mike Kalajian – engineering
 Matthew Kirby – editing
 Dan Korneff – mixing
 Alex Prieto – engineering

Charts

References

2014 albums
Rise Records albums